The following is a list of religious slurs or religious insults in the English language that are, or have been, used as insinuations or allegations about adherents or non-believers of a given religion or irreligion, or to refer to them in a derogatory (critical or disrespectful), pejorative (disapproving or contemptuous), or insulting manner.

Christians

Non-denominational

Protestants

Catholics

Latter Day Saint movement

Jews

Muslims

Hindus

Sikhs

Scientologists

General non-believers
 Giaour  Word for a person who isn't Muslim, but especially for a Christian. Adapted from the Turkish . In the Ottoman Empire, it was usually applied to Orthodox Christians.
 Heathen A person who does not belong to a widely held religion (especially one who is not a Christian, Jewish, or Muslim) as regarded by those who do.
 Infidel A term used generally for non-believers.
 Kaffir A person who is a non believer. Widely used in Muslim majority countries.
 Murtad A word meaning people who left Islam, mainly critics of Islam.
Pagan A person who holds religious beliefs that differ from main world religions. Synonymous with heathen.
Shiksa (female), Shegetz (male) (Yiddish) A non-Jewish girl or boy or one who is of Jewish descent, but does not practice Orthodox Judaism. Also used to refer to non-Jews.

Religious practitioners in general 
 Cult, Cultist Used as an ad hominem attack against groups with differing doctrines or practices.

See also
 Hate speech
 Lists of pejorative terms for people
 List of ethnic slurs

Notes

References
 Richard A. Spears, Slang and Euphemism, (2001)
 John A. Simpson, Oxford Dictionary Of Modern Slang 
 John A. Simpson, Oxford English Dictionary Additions Series 
 

 
Lists of pejorative terms for people
Lists of slang
Profanity
Slurs
Slurs